Mateusz Luty (born 1 January 1990) is a Polish bobsledder. He competed in the two-man event at the 2018 Winter Olympics.

References

1990 births
Living people
Polish male bobsledders
Olympic bobsledders of Poland
Bobsledders at the 2018 Winter Olympics
People from Lower Silesian Voivodeship